Miguel Martinez may refer to:

Miguel Martinez (basketball) (born 1989), Lebanese basketball player
Miguel Martinez (politician), New York City Council member
Miguel Martinez (cyclist) (born 1976), French mountain biker
Miguel Martínez (actor) (born 1991), Mexican actor
Miguel Martínez (wrestler) (born 1991), Cuban sport wrestler
Miguel Martínez, footballer for the Honduran club C.D. Victoria
Miguel Martínez Domínguez (1921–2014), Mexican musician, composer and arranger of mariachi
Miguel Martínez (Spanish footballer) (born 1981), Spanish football goalkeeper
Miguel Martínez (Paraguayan footballer) (born 1998), Paraguayan football goalkeeper
Miguel Edgardo Martínez (born 1965), Honduran politician

See also
Miguel Angel Martínez (disambiguation)